The 2014 Washington State Senate elections is one of the biennial legislative elections in Washington took place on November 4, 2014. In this election, about half of the 49 legislative districts in Washington chose a state senator for a four-year term to the Washington State Senate. The other half of state senators were chosen in the next biennial election, so that about half of the senators are elected at a time: one group in presidential election years (e.g., 2008, 2012, 2016) and the other in other even-numbered election years (e.g., 2010, 2014). All the members of the Washington State House of Representatives are elected concurrently with half of the senators every two years.

24 seats were regularly scheduled to be up this cycle, along with 1 additional seat holding a special election to fill an unexpired term: the 28th district, held by appointed Senator Steve O'Ban, whose former incumbent Mike Carrell vacated the seat.

A top two primary election on August 5, 2014, determined which candidates appear on the November ballot. Candidates were allowed to declare a party preference.

Overview

Composition

Select primary results

District 32

District 35

District 37

General election results

Results as reported by the Secretary of State:

District 6

District 7

District 8

District 13

District 15

District 21

District 26

District 28

District 29

District 30

District 31

District 32

District 33

District 34

District 35

District 36

District 37

District 38

District 42

District 43

District 44

District 45

District 46

District 47

District 48

Notes

References 

Washington State Senate elections
Senate
Washington State Senate